Manuel 'Manolo' Lucena Medina (born 18 November 1982) is a Spanish retired footballer who played as a central defender.

His professional career was mainly associated with Granada, with which he competed in all four major levels of Spanish football.

Club career
Lucena was born in Granada, Andalusia. In 2002 he joined hometown's Granada CF, at the time in Tercera División. After two years as a starter he signed for Marino de Luanco in Segunda División B, being first-choice in his only season as the Asturias club narrowly avoided relegation.

In the summer of 2005, Lucena moved to Sporting de Gijón in Segunda División. In January of the following year, after only three league appearances – seven minutes in total – he returned to Granada, being an essential defensive unit and scoring five goals as the team promoted from the fourth level.

In the following three division three campaigns, Lucena remained a key player for Granada, never appearing in less than 32 league games and occasionally pitching in at defensive midfielder. In 2009–10, already as team captain, he contributed with 26 matches and one goal en route to a return to the second division after 22 years.

In late June 2011, after a second consecutive promotion for Granada, with him as the club's only player from the region of Granada, Lucena renewed his contract for a further two seasons. He made his La Liga debut on 27 August in a 0–1 home loss against Real Betis (90 minutes played), but featured in only nine official contests over the course of two seasons combined, being released subsequently.

Lucena retired at the end of the 2013–14 campaign at the age of 31, after 12 competitive appearances with CD Mirandés in the second level. In February 2015 he returned to Granada, as match delegate.

References

External links

1982 births
Living people
Footballers from Granada
Spanish footballers
Association football defenders
La Liga players
Segunda División players
Segunda División B players
Tercera División players
Granada CF footballers
Marino de Luanco footballers
Sporting de Gijón players
CD Mirandés footballers
CD Imperio de Albolote players